Ranglin is a surname. Notable people with the surname include:

 Alvin Ranglin (born 1942),  Jamaican reggae singer and record producer
 Ernest Ranglin (born 1932),  Jamaican jazz and reggae guitarist
 George Samuel Ranglin (1902–after 1972),  President of the Senate of Jamaica from 1962 to 1972